The North Tasmania Cricket Association Ground, better known as the NTCA Ground, is the oldest first-class cricket ground in Australia. It is a multi-use sports venue situated in Launceston, Australia. In 1851, the ground hosted Australia's first intercolonial and initial first class cricket match. It is currently used mostly for club cricket matches and has a capacity of under 10,000.

History
The NTCA Ground was known as the Launceston Racecourse till 1841, after which it was renamed the Launceston Cricket Club Ground. It held this name till the 1885–86 season, after which it was renamed the North Tasmania Cricket Association Ground, a name that continues till date.

The NTCA Ground was the first cricket ground in Australia to host a first-class cricket match. In 1851, the ground hosted the first ever first-class cricket match in Australia, with the Van Diemen's Land XI defeating the Port Phillip XI. In 1986, it hosted its first – and to date, only – one-day international with a record crowd of 9,876 watching India defeat New Zealand.

Structure
The David Boon Stand on the main wing is the pavilion and main stand, and there are two other smaller stands on that wing, as well as an indoor practice facility, members' building and media building. On the outer is the hill, scoreboard, smaller open stand (old scoreboard stand) and plenty of old trees.

International Events
A One Day International Cricket match between New Zealand and India was held at the NTCA Ground on 2 February 1986. In a rain interrupted match, India won by 22 runs in front of a record crowd of 9,786.

Notes

References

Further reading

External links

 

Sports venues in Tasmania
Cricket grounds in Australia
Australian rules football grounds
Sport in Launceston, Tasmania
Sports venues completed in 1851
1851 establishments in Australia